Uracil phosphoribosyltransferase is an enzyme which creates UMP from uracil and phosphoribosylpyrophosphate. This protein may use the morpheein model of allosteric regulation.

References

External links 
 
 

EC 2.4.2